Miklós Bóna (born October 6, 1967, in Székesfehérvár) is an American mathematician of Hungarian origin.

Bóna completed his undergraduate studies in Budapest and Paris, then obtained his Ph.D. at MIT in 1997 as a student of Richard P. Stanley. Since 1999, he has taught at the University of Florida, where in 2010 he was inducted to the Academy of Distinguished Teaching Scholars.

Bóna's main fields of research include the combinatorics of permutations, as well as enumerative and analytic combinatorics. Since 2010, he has been one of the editors-in-chief of the Electronic Journal of Combinatorics.

Books

External links
 Professional home page

References

20th-century American mathematicians
20th-century Hungarian mathematicians
21st-century American mathematicians
21st-century Hungarian mathematicians
University of Florida faculty
Combinatorialists
1967 births
Living people
Massachusetts Institute of Technology alumni